Moodna is a genus of snout moths described by George Duryea Hulst in 1890.

Species
 Moodna bisinuella Hampson, 1901
 Moodna clitellatella (Ragonot, 1888)
 Moodna formulella Schaus, 1913
 Moodna olivella Hampson in Ragonot, 1901
 Moodna ostrinella (Clemens, 1860)
 Moodna pallidostrinella Neunzig, 1990

References

Phycitinae
Pyralidae genera
Taxa named by George Duryea Hulst